Sergio Casal and Emilio Sánchez were the defending champions, but Emilio Sánchez did not compete this year. Casal teamed up with Javier Sánchez and lost in the semifinals to Pablo Albano and Javier Frana.

Albano and Frana won the title by defeating David Adams and Andrei Olhovskiy 7–6, 4–6, 6–3 in the final.

Seeds

Draw

Draw

References

External links
 Official results archive (ATP)
 Official results archive (ITF)

1993 ATP Tour
ATP Bordeaux